Native Records is a small British independent record label formed in Sheffield, England.

The label was founded by Kevin Donoghue in 1985, after he left RCA Records and during his time at the Music Factory where he was a sound engineer.

In January 1989, Native signed Nine Inch Nails but later released them from their contract when TVT Records offered a better deal.

The label was originally distributed via the Cartel and Red Rhino Records, with Rough Trade distributing in Germany and Radical distributing in Spain. After the collapse of the Cartel in 1989, distribution moved to Polydor Records and subsequently Pinnacle Records. The label is now distributed by Code 7 & and Plastic Head Distribution in the UK.

In 2006, Native formed its own distribution company Indie distribution.

Native continues to release new guitar based bands.

Associated labels include: Ozone Recordings.

Past artists
Native's Past Artists Catalogue includes releases by:

The Barristers, The Fireflys Darling Buds, The Snapdragons, Smashing Orange, Fatal Charm, Deluxe, Steamkings, Greenhouse, Richard H Kirk, Dig Vis Drill, Treebound Story (including Richard Hawley—then a young songwriter), Screaming Trees, The Montgomery Clifts, Berkeley, Torsohorse, Brody, Zoot and the Roots, The Exuberants, UV POP, Midnight Choir, They Must Be Russians, BTroop, The Emotionals, Leafeater, The Junk, Soberskin, Pemberton Grange, Tadpole, Sound Junkies, Moneypenny, Lucigenic, Morph, Ward C, The North.

References

External links
 Official Native Records website
Radio Promotion & Pluggers

British record labels